The Fiat A.50 was a seven-cylinder, air-cooled radial engine for aircraft use built in Italy in the 1930s. It was first run in 1928, it had a bore and stroke of 100 mm × 120 mm (3.94 in × 4.72 in)(6.6 L / 402.6 cuin) and was rated at 78 kW (105 hp) at 1,800 rpm.

Variants
Fiat A.50
Fiat A.50 S

Applications
 Ambrosini SAI.3
 Ambrosini SAI.10
 CANSA C.5
 CANT 26
 Caproni Ca.100
 Fiat AS.1
 IMAM Ro.5

Specifications

See also

References

1920s aircraft piston engines
Aircraft air-cooled radial piston engines
Radial engines
A.50